The fourth series of  Bad Girls  was broadcast on ITV from 28 February 2002, concluded on 13 June 2002 and featured 16 episodes.

Storylines
Yvonne Atkins (Linda Henry) is being framed for Virginia O'Kane's (Kate O'Mara) murder, there is a game of cat and mouse between her and Jim Fenner (Jack Ellis) while the real culprits - Maxi Purvis (Kerry Norton) and Al McKenzie (Pauline Campbell) continue their reign over G-Wing. But it's not long before Yvonne is ruling the roost again, when Denny Blood (Alicya Eyo) returns and tricks Al into confessing to Virginia's murder.

New inmates Roisin Connor and Cassie Tyler are imprisoned for fraud and in a lesbian relationship complicated not only by their being behind bars, but by Roisin's being a married mother-of-two. The stress of G-Wing mounts for Karen Betts (Claire King), especially when she and Fenner split, but the stress is no longer her problem when she is demoted to basic officer and he is promoted to Wing Governor by Neil Grayling (James Gaddas), the new Governing Governor of Larkhall, who developed an attraction to Fenner. Grayling is trying to keep his sexuality a secret, so he and desperate Di Barker (Tracey Wilkinson) participate in a sham marriage, although Di believes she can change his sexuality, which pushes Grayling away.

The bitter hatred between Maxi and Shaz Wiley (Lindsey Fawcett) grows and ends in tragedy following a brutal fight. Crystal Gordon (Sharon Duncan Brewster) gives birth in the four bed dorm to a daughter but soon loses her faith in religion when another baby in the prison dies. Rhiannon Dawson, Julie Johnston's (Kika Mirylees) daughter arrives on the wing and the Julies are soon facing an additional sentence when the truth about Rhiannon's relationship with her boyfriend, Damion, is revealed. The series tackled domestic violence within the relationship of Di and Barry Pearce and teenage junkie Buki's battle for the right to see her disabled son, Lennox.

Yvonne and Karen find themselves at war when Yvonne's son, Ritchie, is revealed to be having a relationship with Karen. This is later revealed as a decoy, as his real girlfriend is new devious inmate, Snowball Merriman (Nicole Faraday), whom Ritchie is helping to escape from Larkhall. The fourth series ended with the prison library being obliterated as part of an escape plan by Snowball, resulting in a fire that left several inmates trapped and fighting for their lives.

Main cast
 Claire King as Karen Betts
 Linda Henry as Yvonne Atkins
 Jack Ellis as Jim Fenner
 Alicya Eyo as Denny Blood
 Sharon Duncan Brewster as Crystal Gordon
 Isabelle Amyes as Barbara Hunt
 Lindsey Fawcett as Shaz Wylie
 Paul Opacic as Mark Waddle
 Kim Oliver as Buki Lester
 Kerry Norton as Maxi Purvis
 Victoria Bush as Tina Purvis/Julie O'Kane
 Pauline Campbell as Al McKenzie
 James Gaddas as Neil Grayling
 Kellie Bright as Cassie Tyler
 Siobhan McCarthy as Roisin Connor
 Nicole Faraday as Snowball Merriman
 Tracey Wilkinson as Di Barker
 Helen Fraser as Sylvia Hollamby
 Victoria Alcock as Julie Saunders
 Kika Mirylees as Julie Johnston

Guest cast

Recurring cast:

 Nathan Constance as Josh Mitchell
 Alex King as Ritchie Atkins
 Michael Elwyn as Rev. Henry Mills
 Andrew Lancel as Barry Pearce
 Jade Williams as Rhiannon Dawson
 Maria Charles as Noreen Biggs
 Eugene Walker as Officer Blakeson

Guest cast:

 Owen Oakeshott as DC O'Leary
 Graham Turner as Curtis
 Lucy Alexander as Newsreader
 Petia Pavlova as Prison Inmate
 David Cann as Francis Cowan
 Susannah Saary as Receptionist
 Mike Dowling as Aidan Connor
 Richard Dixon as Graham Hutton
 Patrick Cremin as DS Davidson
 Adam Leese as Damian Morrison
 Sarah Hadland as Spike
 Vanessa Earl as Nurse Kitt
 Rosemary Smith as Officer Lightfoot
 Lisa Krelset as Nessie
 Alice Kennedy as WPC Lowry
 Martin Milman as Inspector Simms
 Mathilda Thorpe as Inspector Shaw
 Tom Keller as Vince Purvis
 Sarah Winman as Susan Franklin
 David Roper as Mr. Adams
 Bill Wallis as Judge Bradshaw
 Annoushka Le Gallois as Jillian Tyler
 Charis Thomas as Lisa Bell
 Glyn Lewis as Sean Wilson
 Ryan Prygodzicz as Michael Connor
 Polly Kissock as Niamh Connor
 Irene Rambota as Nurse Moss
 Elizabeth Rider as Ms. Green
 Chook Sibtain as Naj Khan Din
 Doyne Byrd as Businessman
 Fenella Norman as PO Harrington

Episodes

Reception

Ratings

Awards and nominations
 National Television Awards (2002) – Most Popular Drama (Nominated)
 TV Quick Awards (2002) – Best Actress (Claire King) (Won)
 TV Quick Awards (2002) – Best Loved Drama (Won)

References

http://www.tv.com/shows/bad-girls/episodes/
http://www.digitalspy.co.uk/soaps/s25/bad-girls/#~p6cA7BQMvw596u

External links
 
 List of Bad Girls episodes at Epguides

04
2002 British television seasons